Liutprand may refer to:

Liutprand, King of the Lombards ruled from 712 to 744
Duke Liutprand of Benevento (died after 759)
Bishop Liutprand of Cremona, (c. 922–972) historian